Thavanur State assembly constituency is one of the 140 state legislative assembly constituencies in Kerala state in southern India. It is also one of the 7 state legislative assembly constituencies included in the Ponnani Lok Sabha constituency. As of the 2021 assembly elections, the current MLA is LDF-independent K. T. Jaleel.

Local self governed segments
Thavanur Niyamasabha constituency is composed of the following local self governed segments:

{ "type": "ExternalData",  "service": "geoshape",  "ids": "Q13113759,Q16135227,Q20579786,Q7689021,Q13111179,Q13114505,Q13110669"}

Members of Legislative Assembly
The following list contains all members of Kerala legislative assembly who have represented Thavanur Niyamasabha Constituency during the period of various assemblies:

Key

Election results
Percentage change (±%) denotes the change in the number of votes from the immediate previous election.

Niyamasabha Election 2021
There were 1,99,960 registered voters in Thavanur Constituency for the 2021 Kerala Niyamasabha Election.

Niyamasabha Election 2016
There were 1,84,868 registered voters in Thavanur Constituency for the 2016 Kerala Niyamasabha Election.

Niyamasabha Election 2011 
There were 1,56,486 registered voters in the constituency for the 2011 election.

See also 
 Thavanur
 Malappuram district
 List of constituencies of the Kerala Legislative Assembly
 2016 Kerala Legislative Assembly election

References 

Assembly constituencies of Kerala

State assembly constituencies in Malappuram district